Goodbye, Mr. Chips is a 1934 novella by James Hilton.

Goodbye, Mr. Chips may also refer to:

 Goodbye, Mr. Chips (1939 film)
 Goodbye, Mr. Chips (1969 film)
 Goodbye, Mr. Chips (2002 film)

See also 

 Mr. Chips (disambiguation)